Black Gold is a 2011 drama film co-produced and directed by Jeta Amata. One local Niger Delta community's struggle against their own government and a multi-national oil corporation who has plundered their land and destroyed the environment. The film was reissued in 2012 with the title Black November, with 60% of the scenes reshot and additional scenes included to make the film "more current".

Premise 
They hope to tell the story from the perspective of people who have lived through it. The people who have seen their land and rivers polluted by oil, the people that are struggling.

Cast 
 Billy Zane
 Tom Sizemore as Detective Brandano
 Hakeem Kae-Kazim as Dede
 Vivica A. Fox as Jackie
 Eric Roberts
 Sarah Wayne Callies as Kate Summers
 Michael Madsen
 Mickey Rourke as Craig Hudson
 Mbong Amata as Ebiere (as Mbong Odungide)
 Shanna Malcolm as Mourner / Protester

See also
Big Oil
Petroleum industry in Nigeria

References

External links
 

Films directed by Jeta Amata
2010s political drama films
Nigerian drama films
Peak oil films
Works about petroleum
2011 drama films
2011 films
2010s English-language films
English-language Nigerian films